University College London, which operates as UCL, is a public research university in London, United Kingdom. It is a member institution of the federal University of London, and is the second-largest university in the United Kingdom by total enrolment and the largest by postgraduate enrolment.

Established in 1826, as London University (though without university degree-awarding powers), by founders inspired by the radical ideas of Jeremy Bentham, UCL was the first university institution to be established in London, and the first in England to be entirely secular and to admit students regardless of their religion. It was also among the first university colleges to admit women alongside men in 1878, two years after University College, Bristol. Intended by its founders to be England's third university, politics forced it to accept the status of a college in 1836, when it received a royal charter and became one of the two founding colleges of the University of London, although it achieved de facto recognition as a university in the 1990s. It has grown through mergers, including with the Institute of Ophthalmology (in 1995), the Institute of Neurology (in 1997), the Royal Free Hospital Medical School (in 1998), the Eastman Dental Institute (in 1999), the School of Slavonic and East European Studies (in 1999), the School of Pharmacy (in 2012) and the Institute of Education (in 2014).

UCL has its main campus in the Bloomsbury area of central London, with a number of institutes and teaching hospitals elsewhere in central London and has a second campus, UCL East, at Queen Elizabeth Olympic Park in Stratford, East London. UCL is organised into 11 constituent faculties, within which there are over 100 departments, institutes and research centres. UCL operates several museums and collections in a wide range of fields, including the Petrie Museum of Egyptian Archaeology and the Grant Museum of Zoology and Comparative Anatomy, and administers the annual Orwell Prize in political writing. In 2021/22, UCL had a total income of £1.75 billion, of which £525 million was from research grants and contracts. The university generates around £10 billion annually for the UK economy, primarily through the spread of its research and knowledge (£4 billion) and the impact of its own spending (£3 billion).

UCL is a member of numerous academic organisations, including the Russell Group and the League of European Research Universities, and is part of UCL Partners, the world's largest academic health science centre. It is considered part of the "golden triangle" of research-intensive universities in southeast England. UCL has publishing and commercial activities including UCL Press, UCL Business and UCL Consultants.

UCL has many notable alumni, including the founder of Mauritius, the first Prime Minister of Japan, and one of the co-discoverers of the structure of DNA. UCL academics discovered five of the naturally occurring noble gases, discovered hormones, invented the vacuum tube, and made several foundational advances in modern statistics. , 30 Nobel Prize winners and three Fields medallists have been affiliated with UCL as alumni or academic staff.

History

1826 to 1836 – London University

UCL was founded on 11 February 1826 as an alternative to the Anglican universities of Oxford and Cambridge. It took the form of a joint stock company, with shares sold for £100 to proprietors, under the name of London University, although without legal recognition as a university or the associated right to award degrees. London University's first warden was Leonard Horner, who was the first scientist to head a British university.

Despite the commonly held belief that the philosopher Jeremy Bentham was the founder of UCL, his direct involvement was limited to the purchase of share No. 633, at a cost of £100 paid in nine instalments between December 1826 and January 1830. In 1828, he did nominate a friend to sit on the council, and in 1827, attempted to have his disciple John Bowring appointed as the first professor of English or History, but on both occasions his candidates were unsuccessful. However, Bentham is commonly regarded as the "spiritual father" of UCL, as his ideas on education and society were influential with the institution's founders, particularly James Mill (1773–1836) and Henry Brougham (1778–1868).

In 1828, the chair of political economy at London University was created, with John Ramsay McCulloch as the first incumbent. In 1829, the university appointed the first professor of English in England, although the course concentrated on linguistics and the modern teaching of English – studying English literature – was introduced by King's College London in 1831. In 1830, London University founded the London University School, which would later become University College School. In 1833, the university appointed Alexander Maconochie, secretary to the Royal Geographical Society, as the first professor of geography in Britain. Classes in medicine began at the opening of the college in 1828, and in 1834 University College Hospital (originally North London Hospital) opened as a teaching hospital for these classes, which were organised into a faculty of medicine in 1836.

1836 to 1900 – University College, London
After almost a decade of attempting to win recognition as a university and the right to award degrees, including an Address to the Crown from the House of Commons, the proprietors of London University accepted the government's proposal to establish the University of London as an independent examining body, accepting the status of a college for their institution. As a result, the proprietors of London University were incorporated by royal charter under the name University College, London on 28 November 1836. On the same day, the University of London was created by royal charter as a degree-awarding examining board for students from affiliated schools and colleges, with University College and King's College, London being named in the charter as the first two affiliates. The first students from UCL and King's matriculated as undergraduates in 1838 and the first degrees were awarded to students of the two colleges in 1839.

There had been an intention to establish a course in engineering at the college's opening but no professor was appointed until 1840 or 1841, after engineering courses had started at Durham University (1837) and King's College London (1838).

The Slade School of Fine Art was founded as part of University College in 1871, following a bequest from Felix Slade.

In 1878, the University of London gained a supplemental charter making it the first British university to be allowed to award degrees to women. The same year, UCL admitted women to the faculties of Arts and Law and of Science, although women remained barred from the faculties of Engineering and of Medicine (with the exception of courses on public health and hygiene). UCL's admission of women in 1878 came almost three decades after Bedford College became the first institution to offer university-level education for women in Britain, followed by other women's colleges such as Girton College, Cambridge (1869) and Newnham College, Cambridge (1871), and the establishment of the University of London's General Examination for Women in 1868.

The Ladies' Educational Association held classes for women from 1868, taught by professors from UCL but independently of the college. From 1871–2 these were held inside the college building, although still independently of the college. From 1872, some professors, particularly Edward Poynter of the Slade, started to admit women to their classes. The full opening on the faculties of arts, science and law in 1878 came two years after the admission of women alongside men at the University of Bristol from its foundation (as University College Bristol) in 1876. Armstrong College (a predecessor institution of Newcastle University) also allowed women to enter from its foundation in 1871, although none actually enrolled until 1881, The first woman to officially enrol in architecture at UCL was Gertrude Leverkus in 1915, although  Ethel and Bessie Charles had been allowed to audit classes in the 1890s. Women were finally admitted to medical studies during the First World War in 1917, although limitations were placed on their numbers after the war ended.

In 1898, Sir William Ramsay discovered the elements krypton, neon and xenon whilst professor of chemistry at UCL.

A new royal charter granted to the University of London in 1858 effectively removed the affiliation of colleges to the university. Dissatisfaction from the colleges and the desire for a "teaching university" in London led to royal commissions that reported in 1888 and 1892 and the reconstitution of the university under the University of London Act 1898.

1900 to 1976 – University of London, University College
In 1900, the University of London was reconstituted as a federal university with new statutes drawn up under the University of London Act 1898. UCL, along with a number of other colleges in London, became a school of the University of London. While most of the constituent institutions retained their autonomy, UCL chose to be merged into the university in 1907 under the University College London (Transfer) Act 1905 and surrendered its legal independence in return for gaining a greater say in the running of the university. Its formal name became University of London, University College, although for most informal and external purposes the name "University College, London" (or the initialism UCL) was still used.  it remains listed as "University of London: University College" on US Federal Student Aid applications.

1900 also saw the decision to appoint a salaried head of the college. The first incumbent was Carey Foster, who served as Principal (as the post was originally titled) from 1900 to 1904. He was succeeded by Gregory Foster (no relation), and in 1906 the title was changed to Provost to avoid confusion with the principal of the University of London. Gregory Foster remained in post until 1929. In 1906, the Cruciform Building was opened as the new home for University College Hospital. UCL opened the first department and chair of chemical engineering in the UK, funded by the Ramsay Memorial Fund in 1923.

As it acknowledged and apologised for in 2021, UCL played "a fundamental role in the development, propagation and legitimisation of eugenics" during the first half of the 20th century. Among the prominent eugenicists associated with UCL were major donor Francis Galton, who coined the term "eugenics", and Karl Pearson, first Galton Professor of Eugenics at UCL. An annual eugenics conference, the London Conference on Intelligence was held at UCL as an external paid event between 2014 and 2017. An enquiry in 2018 found that the organiser, an honorary lecture, did not correctly follow the room booking procedure, including claiming that no controversial topics would be discussed, leaving the university unaware of the nature of the conference. Due to its failure to address the situation on campus at the time, a majority of the authors of the 2020 report on eugenics at UCL that led to the university's apology refused to sign the final report. The Galton Lecture Theatre, Pearson Lecture Theatre and Pearson Building were all renamed in 2020. In 2021, UCL was criticized (along with Oxford, Imperial and other London universities) for accepting money from the Alexander Mosley Charitable Trust, established to hold the fortune left to Max Mosley by his father, British fascist leader Oswald Mosley. UCL received £500,000 to establish a forensic evidence interpretation laboratory.

In 1911, UCL received an anonymous donation of £30,000 for a building for its school of architecture. In 1919 the donor consented to being named as Herbert Bartlett and the school was renamed in his honour.

UCL sustained considerable bomb damage during the Second World War, including the complete destruction of the Great Hall, the Carey Foster Physics Laboratory and the Ramsay Laboratory. Fires gutted the library and destroyed much of the main building, including the dome; it was not until 1954 that the main building was fully restored. The departments were dispersed across the country to Aberystwyth, Bangor, Gwynedd, Cambridge, Oxford, Rothamsted near Harpenden, Hertfordshire and Sheffield, with the administration at Stanstead Bury near Ware, Hertfordshire. The first UCL student newspaper, Pi, was founded in 1946. The Institute of Jewish Studies relocated from Manchester to UCL in 1959.

The Mullard Space Science Laboratory was established in 1967. In 1973, Peter Kirstein's research group at UCL became one of two international nodes on the ARPANET. UCL's interconnection between the ARPANET and early British academic networks was the first international heterogenous resource sharing network. UCL adopted TCP/IP in 1982, a year ahead of ARPANET, and played a significant role in the very earliest experimental Internet work.

The college's senior common room, the Housman Room, remained men-only until 1969. After two unsuccessful attempts, a motion was passed that ended segregation by sex at UCL. This was achieved by Brian Woledge (Fielden Professor of French at UCL from 1939 to 1971) and David Colquhoun, at that time a young lecturer in pharmacology.

1976 to 2005 – University College London

In 1976, a new charter restored UCL's legal independence, although still without the power to award its own degrees. Under this charter the college became formally known as University College London. This name abandoned the comma used in its earlier name of "University College, London".

In 1993, a reorganisation of the University of London meant that UCL and other colleges gained direct access to government funding and the right to confer University of London degrees themselves. This led to UCL being regarded as a de facto university in its own right.

Mergers were a major feature of this period of UCL's history. In 1986, the college merged with the Institute of Archaeology. In 1988, UCL merged with the Institute of Laryngology & Otology, the Institute of Orthopaedics, the Institute of Urology & Nephrology and Middlesex Hospital Medical School. Middlesex and University College hospitals, together with the Elizabeth Garrett Anderson Hospital and the Hospital for Tropical Diseases, formed the University College London Hospitals NHS Trust in 1994.

Mergers continued in the 1990s, with the Institute of Child Health joining in 1995,  the School of Podiatry in 1996 and the Institute of Neurology in 1997. In 1998, UCL merged with the Royal Free Hospital Medical School to create the Royal Free and University College Medical School (renamed the UCL Medical School in October 2008). In 1999, UCL merged with the School of Slavonic and East European Studies and the Eastman Dental Institute.

Proposals for a merger between UCL and Imperial College London were announced in 2002. The proposal provoked strong opposition from UCL teaching staff and students and the AUT union, which criticised "the indecent haste and lack of consultation", leading to its abandonment by UCL provost Sir Derek Roberts. The blogs that helped to stop the merger are preserved, though some of the links are now broken: see David Colquhoun's blog and the Save UCL blog, which was run by David Conway, a postgraduate student at UCL.

From 2005 

UCL was granted its own taught and research degree awarding powers in 2005,and all UCL students registered from 2007/08 qualified with UCL degrees. The same year, UCL adopted a new corporate branding under which the name University College London was replaced by the initialism UCL in all external communications.

UCL established the UCL School of Energy & Resources in Adelaide, Australia, in 2008 as the first campus of a British university in the country. The school was based in the historic Torrens Building in Victoria Square and its creation followed negotiations between UCL Vice Provost Michael Worton and South Australian Premier Mike Rann. In 2011, the mining company BHP Billiton agreed to donate AU$10 million to UCL to fund the establishment of two energy institutes – the Energy Policy Institute, based in Adelaide, and the Institute for Sustainable Resources, based in London. The UCL Australia satellite campus closed in December 2017, with academic staff and student transferring to the University of South Australia.  the University of South Australia and UCL are offering a joint masters qualification in Science in Data Science (international).

In 2011, UCL announced plans for a £500 million investment in its main Bloomsbury campus over 10 years, as well as the establishment of a new  campus (UCL East) next to the Olympic Park in Stratford in the East End of London. UCL East was conceived as part of plans to transform the Olympic Park into a cultural and innovation hub, where UCL would open its first school of design, a centre of experimental engineering and a museum of the future, along with a living space for students. In 2018, UCL opened UCL at Here East, at the Queen Elizabeth Olympic Park, offering courses jointly between the Bartlett Faculty of the Built Environment and the Faculty of Engineering Sciences and a variety of undergraduate and postgraduate master's degrees. The first undergraduate students, on a new Engineering and Architectural Design MEng, started in September 2018. One Pool Street, the first building on the campus, opened in November 2022, with the opening of Marshfield, completing the first phase of UCL East, expected in autumn 2023.

UCL continued to grow through mergers with smaller colleges in the University of London. On 1 January 2012 the School of Pharmacy, University of London merged with UCL, becoming the UCL School of Pharmacy within the Faculty of Life Sciences. UCL and the Institute of Education formed a strategic alliance in October 2012, followed by a full merger in December 2014.

UCL paid tens of thousands of pounds to settle ten sexual harassment claims against staff in the 2017/18 academic year, a rise from four cases the year before. Following pressure from victims, it announced in 2018 that it would abandon non-disclosure settlements in settlements. The university made the decision after physicist Emma Chapman sued the institution for sexual harassment through the law firm of Ann Olivarius and then won the legal right to speak freely about her abuse at the university. Chapman settled the case for £70,000. In 2020, UCL became the first Russell Group university to ban romantic and sexual relationships between lecturers and their students.

In October 2017, UCL's council voted to apply for university status while remaining part of the University of London. UCL's application to become a university was subject to Parliament passing a bill to amend the statutes of the University of London, which received royal assent on 20 December 2018. Following approval of UCL's application for university title from the Office for Students, the UCL Council voted to submit a petition for a supplemental charter to the Privy Council to formally implement this, along with permission to revise the statutes. The supplemental charter was approved by the Privy Council on 14 December 2022 and an order made that it be prepared for the king's signature.

Campus and locations

Bloomsbury

UCL is primarily based in the Bloomsbury area of the London Borough of Camden, in Central London. The main campus is located around Gower Street and includes the UCL Faculty of Engineering Sciences, economics, geography, history, languages, mathematics, management, philosophy and physics departments, the preclinical facilities of the UCL Medical School, the London Centre for Nanotechnology, the Slade School of Fine Art, the UCL Union, the main UCL Library, the UCL Science Library, the Bloomsbury Theatre, the Petrie Museum of Egyptian Archaeology, the Grant Museum of Zoology and the affiliated University College Hospital. Close by in Bloomsbury are the UCL Cancer Institute, the UCL Faculty of Social and Historical Sciences, the UCL Faculty of the Built Environment (The Bartlett), the UCL Faculty of Laws, the UCL Institute of Archaeology, the UCL Institute of Education, the UCL School of Pharmacy, the UCL School of Public Policy and the UCL School of Slavonic and East European Studies.

The area around Queen Square in Bloomsbury, close by to the main campus, is a hub for brain-related research and healthcare, with the UCL Institute of Cognitive Neuroscience and UCL Institute of Neurology located in the area along with the affiliated National Hospital for Neurology and Neurosurgery. The UCL Great Ormond Street Institute of Child Health and the affiliated Great Ormond Street Hospital for Children are located adjacently, forming a hub for paediatric research and healthcare. The UCL Ear Institute, the UCL Eastman Dental Institute and the affiliated Royal National Throat, Nose and Ear Hospital and Eastman Dental Hospital are located nearby in east Bloomsbury along Gray's Inn Road and form hubs for research and healthcare in audiology and dentistry respectively.

Historic UCL buildings in Bloomsbury include the grade I listed UCL Main Building, including the original Wilkins building designed by William Wilkins, and, directly opposite on Gower Street, the early 20th century grade II listed Cruciform Building, the last major building designed by Alfred Waterhouse. Nearby are the grade II listed Kathleen Lonsdale Building, UCL's first purpose-built chemistry laboratory, and the grade II listed Rockefeller Building. Elsewhere in Bloomsbury is the 1970s grade II* Institute of Education building by Denys Lasdun and Partners. Much of the estate falls within the Bloomsbury Conservation Area, designated in 1968. Important contemporary buildings include the School of Slavonic and East European Studies building (RIBA Award winner 2006) and the Sainsbury Wellcome Centre for Neural Circuits and Behaviour building (LEAF Award for best façade design and engineering and overall winner 2016).

UCL East
In 2014, it was announced that UCL would be building an additional campus at the Queen Elizabeth Olympic Park, referred to as UCL East, as part of the development of the so-called Olympicopolis site at the southern edge of the park. UCL master planners were appointed in spring 2015, and the first University building was, at that time, estimated to be completed in time for academic year 2019/20.

It was revealed in June 2016 that the UCL East expansion could see the university grow to 60,000 students. The proposed rate of growth was reported to be causing concern, with calls for it to be slowed down to ensure the university could meet financial stability targets.

Outline planning permission for UCL East was submitted in May 2017 by the London Legacy Development Corporation and UCL, and granted in March 2018. Construction of the first phase of buildings is (as of March 2018) expected to begin in 2019 with the first building (Pool Street West) expected (at the time) to be completed for the start of the 2021 academic year and the second building (Marshgate 1) opening in phases from September 2022. As of March 2018, phase 1 is intended to have  of space, and to provide space for 4,000 extra students and 260 extra academic staff, while the entire UCL East campus, when completed, is expected to have  of space, 40% of the size of UCL's central London campus. According to the planning documents, construction of phase 2 (Pool Street East and Marshfield 2, 3 and 4) is expected to begin in 2030 and be completed by 2034, and the whole project will support 2,337 academic staff and 11,169 students. The campus will include residences for up to 1,800 students. In June 2018, UCL revealed that the UK government would be providing £100 million of funding for UCL East as part of its £151 million contribution to the £1.1 billion redevelopment of the Olympic Park as a cultural and education district to be known as the East Bank. Construction work on UCL East began on 2 July 2019 with a ground breaking ceremony by the Mayor of London, Sadiq Khan, and work on Pool Street West began on 28 February 2020.

In 2018, UCL opened a campus within Here East, the Olympic Park's former Media Centre.

The first building at UCL East, renamed One Pool Street, was due to open in September 2022. However, supply chain challenges led to a delay in the building being handed over by the contractors, with students being relocated to other accommodation on short notice. One Pool Street was handed over to UCL in October 2022, with the first students moving into accommodation and teaching starting in November 2022.

Other sites

Elsewhere in Central London are the UCL Institute of Ophthalmology adjacent to Moorfields Eye Hospital in Clerkenwell, the UCL Institute of Child Health adjacent to Great Ormond Street Hospital, the Royal Free Hospital and the Whittington Hospital campuses of the UCL Medical School, and a number of other associated teaching hospitals. The UCL School of Management is on levels 38 and 50 (penthouse) of One Canada Square in the financial district of Canary Wharf. The UCL Observatory is in Mill Hill  and the Mullard Space Science Laboratory is based in Holmbury St Mary, Surrey. The UCL Athletics Ground is in Shenley, Hertfordshire.

Student housing

UCL owns 26 halls of residence with around 7,000 student beds. The university guarantees accommodation to single full-time first-year undergraduate students who have not previously lived in London while studying at a university, and who make a firm acceptance of a place and apply for accommodation by 10 June each year, and to single overseas first-year postgraduates at UCL who have not previously lived in London while studying at a university, and who make a firm acceptance of a place and apply for accommodation by 30 June each year. Accommodation is also guaranteed for students who are under 18 at the start of the academic year  and for students who are care-leavers. There is only limited accommodation available in university halls for returning students and others who do not meet the criteria for a guaranteed place. UCL students are also eligible, as students of a member institution of the University of London, to apply for places in the University of London intercollegiate halls of residence.

In 2013, UCL's newly-built New Hall student accommodation building on Caledonian Road, designed by Stephen George and Partners, was awarded the Carbuncle Cup and named the country's worst new building by Building Design magazine, with the comment "this is a building that the jury struggled to see as remotely fit for human occupation". Islington Council had originally turned down planning permission for the building, but this had been overturned on appeal. As it is classified as a hotel or guest house, it was exempt from many of the standards that cover residential buildings, such as having daylight in the rooms.

The UCL East development includes 532 student rooms in One Pool Street, which opened in 2022. Further accommodation will be available in the Marshgate building, expected to open in 2023, and at the second Pool Street site.

Environmental initiatives

UCL's new Student Centre, which opened in 2019, was designed to be environmentally friendly and was one of only 320 buildings worldwide (at the time) to be certified outstanding by BREEAM. This certification requires innovation throughout the design, engineering and construction process, and places the Student Centre among the top 1% of buildings in the UK for sustainability. The UCL Student Centre was a finalist at the Green Gown Awards in 2019.

Also in 2019, UCL launched a Strategy for Sustainable UCL 2019-24, including three initiatives to promote sustainability. The Positive Climate initiative saw UCL pledge to have a 40% reduction in energy usage, all energy to come from renewables, and all UCL buildings to be carbon neutral by 2024, along with achieving net zero carbon emissions for UCL by 2030. The Positive Climate initiative was the winner in the "2030 Climate Action" category at the 2020 Green Gown Awards.

A second initiative, The Loop, promotes circular economy. UCL set a target of reducing waste per person by 20% between 2019 and 2024, while aiming for an 85% recycling rate and the elimination single-use plastics on campus. The third initiative, Wild Bloomsbury, promotes biodiversity. UCL set a target of creating  of biodiverse green space on campus by 2024. The Strategy for a Sustainable UCL was a finalist in the "Sustainable Institution of the Year" category at the 2022 Green Gown Awards.

Organisation and administration

Governance
The two main bodies in UCL's governance structure are the council and the academic board, both of which are established by the royal charter and with powers defined by the statutes. There is also a University Management Committee, which is the executive committee responsible for the day-to-day operations of the institution. This comprises the President and Provost, the vice-presidents, the vice-provosts, the pro-provost of UCL East, the deans of the faculties, the chief financial officer, chief information officer, and chief people officer, the chief of staff, the general consul, the executive director of media and marketing, and the director of media relations.

The senior leadership team at UCL includes the visitor. That there shall be a visitor of the college is specified by the royal charter, as is that the position is to be held by the Master of the Rolls, the second most senior judge in England and Wales.

UCL's council comprises 20 members, of whom 11 are members external to UCL; seven are UCL academic staff, including the provost, three UCL professors and three non-professorial staff; and two are UCL students. The chair is appointed by council for a term not normally exceeding five years. The chair is ex officio chair of the honorary degrees and fellowships committee, nominations committee and remuneration and strategy committee. The current chair of the council is international businessman and UCL alumnus Victor Chu.

The academic board plays a role similar to the senate in other institutions. It is the senior academic body responsible for advising council on academic matters and also elects academic members to council. It is, however, a much larger body than the senates at many other universities, including all professors as well as elected representatives of other academic and non-academic staff.

UCL's principal academic and administrative officer is the President and Provost, who is also UCL's designated accountable officer for reporting to the Office for Students on behalf of UCL.  The provost is appointed by Council after consultation with the academic board, and is ex officio a member of council and chair of the academic board. The president and provost since January 2021 is Michael Spence, formerly vice chancellor of The University of Sydney, who succeeded Michael Arthur.

Vice-provosts are appointed by council on the recommendation of the provost or the academic board, to assist and advise the provost as required. The vice-provosts are members of the provost's senior management team. There are four vice-provosts (for education and student experience; health; research, innovation and global engagement; and faculties). There are also four vice-presidents, who are also members of the senior management team but whose role and manner of appointment is not specified in the statutes, for strategy, external engagement, advancement and operations.

The deans of UCL's faculties are appointed by the council and are members of the provost's senior management team. The deans' principal duties include advising the provost and vice-provosts on academic strategy, staffing matters and resources for academic departments within their faculty; overseeing curricula and programme management at faculty level; liaising with faculty tutors on undergraduate admissions and student academic matters; overseeing examination matters at faculty level; and co-ordinating faculty views on matters relating to education and information support.

List of provosts
The following have served as the head of UCL. Between 1831 and 1900 there was no full-time head of the college, only a secretary.

Warden:
 Leonard Horner (1827–1831)
Principal:
 Carey Foster (1900–1904)
 Sir Gregory Foster (1904–1906)
Provost:
 Sir Gregory Foster (1906–1929)
 Sir Allen Mawer (1930–1942)
 David Pye (1943–1951)
 Sir Ifor Evans (1951–1966)
 Lord Annan (1966–1978)
 Sir James Lighthill (1979–1989)
 Sir Derek Roberts (1989–1999; 2002–2003)
 Sir Christopher Llewellyn Smith (1999–2002)
 Sir Malcolm Grant (2003–2013)
 Michael Arthur (2013–2021)
 Michael Spence (2021–present)

Faculties and departments

UCL's research and teaching is organised into eleven faculties, each of which contains a number of schools, departments and institutes. The establishment of faculties and academic departments is formally the responsibility of UCL's council, with advice from the academic board.

There are also two academic units outside of the faculty structure:
 Sainsbury Wellcome Centre for Neural Circuits and Behaviour
 School of Slavonic and East European Studies: 193 staff; 559 undergraduate students; 57 taught postgraduate students; 29 research postgraduate students (2022/23)

There are additional staff employed outside of the faculty structure in the university administration.

Finances
In the financial year ended 31 July 2020, UCL had a total income (excluding share of joint ventures) of £1.54 billion (2018/19 – £1.49 billion) and a total expenditure of £1.34 billion (2018/19 – £1.67 billion). Key sources of income included £467.7 million from research grants and contracts (2018/19 – £481.1 million), £613.7 million from tuition fees and education contracts (2018/19 – £564.9 million), £227.9 million from funding body grants (2018/19 – £213.5 million) and £26.6 million from donations and endowments (2018/19 – £40.5 million). At year end UCL had endowments of £143.2 million (31 July 2019 – £138.7 million) and total net assets of £1.49 billion (31 July 2019 – £1.29 million).

A report by London Economics in 2022 found that UCL generates around £10 billion annually for the UK economy. The largest contributor to this is through the spread of its research and knowledge, which is worth £4 billion, with another £3 billion being added by the impact of UCL's own spending. Other contributions come from encouraging graduates to create jobs and investment, and from nurturing company spin-offs and start-ups. The report found that in 2018–19, UCL had supported 234 graduate start-ups and 83 spinout companies, with a total turnover of £110 million and employing almost 3,000 people. The report also found that UCL's spending supported 19,000 jobs across the UK, with over 7,000 of these being outside of London.

Terms
The UCL academic year is divided into three terms. For most departments, First Term runs from late September to mid December, Second Term from mid January to late March, and Third Term from late April to mid June, with reading weeks in early November and mid February.  Certain courses at the medical school, the faculty of education and society, and the school of pharmacy operate on different terms.

Logo and colours
While many universities use their logo for most communications and branding and a coat of arms only for specific ceremonial and official use, UCL exclusively uses a logo and has no coat of arms. The present logo was adopted as part of a rebranding exercise in August 2005. Prior to that date, a different logo was used, in which the letters UCL were incorporated into a stylised representation of the Wilkins Building portico.

 

A pseudo-heraldic "UCL crest" – a purple shield depicting a raised bent arm dressed in armour between two gold laurel branches holding a green upturned open wreath, with the college motto on a blue celeste ribbon beneath the laurel branches – can be found on the internet. A version of this badge (not on a shield) appears to have been used by UCL Union from shortly after its foundation in 1893. However, the badge has never been the subject of an official grant of arms, and departs from several of the rules and conventions of heraldry. It is not an official logo, although modified forms are used by some by sports teams and societies. The official Team UCL logo, used (with variants) by many sports teams, uses a shield divided into the colours of purple (lower) and blue celeste (upper), but none of the other elements (laurels, wreaths, armoured arm, motto) are present; the only graphic is a depiction of the UCL portico. Students' Union UCL requests teams not to add or change this logo, but this is widely ignored.

UCL's motto, "Cuncti adsint meritaeque expectent praemia palmae" is a quotation from Virgil's Aeneid, and translates into English as "Let all come who by merit deserve the most reward".

UCL's traditional sporting and academic colours are purple [rgb(80,7,120)] and blue celeste [rgb(164,219,232)]. UCL uses a palette of 25 colours (including the two traditional colours) in its visual identity; the logo can be used in many different combinations of these colours.

Memberships, affiliations and partnerships

UCL is a member institution of the federal University of London and was one of the two colleges affiliated from the university's founding in 1836 (the other being King's College London).

UCL was a founding member of the Russell Group, an association of 24 British research universities established in 1994, and is regarded as forming part of the 'golden triangle', an unofficial term for the research-intensive universities located in the southern English cities of Cambridge, London and Oxford

UCL has been a member of the League of European Research Universities since January 2006. UCL is also a member of the Association of Commonwealth Universities, the European University Association, the global U7+ Alliance and the US Universities Research Association, and has a major collaboration with Yale University, the Yale UCL Collaborative. It also has partnerships with universities in Australia, Canada, China, India, Japan, Singapore and Thailand.

UCL formed the Science and Engineering South engineering and physical sciences research alliance with the universities of Cambridge, Oxford, Southampton and Imperial College London in May 2013. It was also one of the founding members of the Alan Turing Institute, the UK's national institute for data sciences and artificial intelligence, in 2015, with the universities of Cambridge, Edinburgh, Oxford and Warwick.

UCL is a partner in UCLPartners, an academic health science centre, along with multiple NHS trusts, integrated care systems, research and innovation partners, and other universities. UCL is a partner with the National Institute for Health Research, the University College London Hospitals NHS Foundation Trust and UCLPartners in the UCLH Biomedical Research Centre. UCL is also a university partner of the Francis Crick Institute, a major biomedical research centre in London.

UCL offers dual degrees and joint degrees with other universities and institutions, including the University of Cologne, Columbia University, the University of Hong Kong, Imperial College London (ending 2023) and New York University.

UCL is the sponsor of the UCL Academy, a secondary school in the London Borough of Camden. The school opened in September 2012 and was the first in the UK to have a university as sole sponsor. UCL also has a strategic partnership with Newham Collegiate Sixth Form Centre.

Academic profile

Research

In 2021/22, UCL had an income from research grants and contracts of £524.9 million, making up 30% of all revenue. The largest sources of research income were research council grants (£170.4 million) and British charities (£154.4 million). A further £159.3 million of recurrent research funding was allocated to UCL by Research England, making up 9% of income.

UCL submitted 3,432 staff (3,177 FTEs) across 32 units of assessment (areas of research) to the 2021 Research Excellence Framework (REF) assessment. 58% of submitted research was rated 4* ('world leading'), the sixth highest in the REF, and a further 34% as 3* ('internationally excellent'). Overall, UCL was ranked second for both research power and market share by both Times Higher Education and Research Professional News, and sixth on research quality (GPA) by Times Higher Education. UCL submitted more units of assessment to the 2021 REF than any other university. However, UCL's market share (based on the funding formula) declined from 6.23% following the 2014 REF to 5.34%, despite the overall improvement, reflecting increases in research quality across the sector.

Research centres
UCL operates a large number of disciplinary-specific research centres in partnership with other research institutions and private enterprises. Notable examples include:

London Centre for Nanotechnology

The London Centre for Nanotechnology (LCN) is a multidisciplinary research centre in physical and biomedical nanotechnology based at UCL's campus in Bloomsbury. It is a partnership between UCL, Imperial College London and King's College London. The LCN was established as a joint venture between UCL and Imperial College London in 2003; King's College London joined the LCN in 2018.

Centre for the Study of the Legacies of British Slave-ownership

The Centre for the Study of the Legacies of British Slave-ownership was established at UCL with the support of the Hutchins Center for African and African American Research at Harvard University. It incorporates two earlier projects: the Legacies of British Slave-ownership project (2009–2012) and the Structure and significance of British Caribbean slave-ownership 1763–1833 project (2013–2015).

Sainsbury Wellcome Centre for Neural Circuits and Behaviour

The Sainsbury Wellcome Centre for Neural Circuits and Behaviour (SWC) is a neuroscience research centre established at UCL with funding from the Gatsby Charitable Foundation and Wellcome Trust and opened in 2016.

Publishing and commercialisation
In 2020/21, UCL had an income of £7.3 million from intellectual property and £25.2 million from the sale of shares in spin-off companies. As of 2020/21, UCL had the second largest patent portfolio of any UK university (after Oxford) with 2,391 patents. It granted the third largest number of intellectual property licences (after Oxford and the University of East Anglia), with 2,235.

UCL Business

UCL Business is a technology transfer company which is wholly owned by UCL. It has three main activities: licensing technologies, creating spin-out companies, and project management. UCL Business supports spin-out companies in areas including discovery disclosure, commercialisation, business plan development, contractual advice, incubation support, recruitment of management teams and identification of investors. In the area of licensing technoloiges, UCL Business provides commercial, legal and administrative advice to help companies broker licensing agreements. UCL Business also provides UCL departments and institutes with project management services for single or multi-party collaborative industry projects.

UCL Business transferred £4.8 million of royalty income to UCL in 2021/22.

UCL Consultants
UCL Consultants is an academic consultancy services company which is wholly owned by UCL. It provides four main service offerings: Academic Consultancy, Bespoke Short Courses, Testing & Analysis and Expert Witness.

UCL Press
Launched in 2015, UCL Press is a new university press (NUP) wholly owned by UCL. It was the first fully open access university press in the UK, and publishes monographs, textbooks and other academic books in a wide range of academic areas which are available to download for free, in addition to a number of journals. As of October 2022, UCL Press had had more than 6.5 million downloads of its open access books in 247 countries and territories worldwide.

Libraries

The UCL library system comprises 18 libraries located across the Bloomsbury and UCL East campuses. The libraries contain a total of over 2 million books. The largest library is the UCL Main Library, which is located in the UCL Main Building and contains collections relating to the arts and humanities, economics, history, law and public policy. The second largest library is the UCL Science Library, which is located in the DMS Watson Building on Malet Place and contains collections relating to anthropology, engineering, geography, life sciences, management and the mathematical and physical sciences. The Cruciform Hub contains books and periodicals in the subjects of clinical medicine and medical science. It holds the combined collections of the former Boldero and Clinical Sciences libraries which developed within the Middlesex Hospital, University College Hospital and Royal Free & University College Medical Schools up until their merger in 2005. Other libraries include the UCL Bartlett Library (architecture and town planning), the UCL Eastman Dental Institute Library (oral health sciences), the UCL Institute of Archaeology Library (archaeology and egyptology), the UCL Institute of Education's Newsam Library (education and related areas of social science), the UCL Institute of Neurology Rockefeller Medical Library (neurosurgery and neuroscience), the Joint Moorfields Eye Hospital & the UCL Institute of Ophthalmology Library (biomedicine, medicine, nursing, ophthalmology and visual science), the UCL Language & Speech Science Library (audiology, communication disorders, linguistics & phonetics, special education, speech & language therapy and voice) and the UCL School of Slavonic and East European Studies Library (the economics, geography, history, languages, literature and politics of Eastern Europe). The newest library is the UCL East Library, currently located in the Learning Hub on the first floor of One Pool Street. Uniquely among UCL libraries, it offers a 'click and collect' service allowing books from any UCL library to be delivered to UCL East rather than having to be picked up from the library that holds them. It is expected to relocate to the new Marshgate building when that opens in September 2023.

UCL staff and students have full access to the main libraries of the University of London – the Senate House Library and the libraries of the institutes of the School of Advanced Study – which are located close to the main UCL campus in Bloomsbury. These libraries contain over 3.7 million books and focus on the arts, humanities and social sciences. The British Library, which contains around 14 million books, is also located close to the main UCL campus and all UCL students and staff can apply for reference access.

UCL's open access institutional repository, UCL Discovery, and UCL Press, UCL's open access academic press are managed by UCL Library Services.

Special collections
UCL's Special Collections contains UCL's collection of historical or culturally significant works. It holds over 150,000 rare books, including 179 incunabula, as well as over 600 collections of archives and manuscripts. The incunabula include a 1477 edition of Dante's Divine Comedy, and a 1493 edition of the Nuremberg Chronicle donated by Jeremy Bentham.

UCL's most significant works are housed in three strong rooms. The special collection includes first editions of Isaac Newton's Principia, Charles Darwin's On the Origin of Species and James Joyce's Ulysses.

Museums

UCL is responsible for several museums and collections in a wide range of fields across the arts and sciences, including:

 Petrie Museum of Egyptian Archaeology: Founded in 1892 by a donation from Amelia Edwards of several hundred Egyptian items, the museum now contains around 80,000 items and covers the history of the Nile valley from prehistoric times through to the Islamic period. It is named after William Flinders Petrie, the first Edwards Professor at UCL, who excavated dozens of sites in his career and sold his collection to the college in 1913. The Petrie Museum is a designated collection under the Arts Council England Designation Scheme for "pre-eminent collections held in museums, libraries and archives across England".
 UCL Art Museum: the art collection originated as a teaching and research collection for the Slade, and contains works by women artists dating back to the 1890s. A series of plaster casts of full-size details of sculptures by John Flaxman is located inside the library under the  dome of the UCL Main Building.
 Grant Museum of Zoology and Comparative Anatomy: Established in 1827 by Robert Edmund Grant, UCL's first professor of comparative anatomy and zoology, for teaching purposes. Grant bequeathed his collection of 10,000 specimens to UCL upon his death. With other additions, the museum now contains around 68,000 specimens, including dodo bones and a rare quagga skeleton.

Reputation and rankings

National
UCL is ranked as one of the top ten universities in all three of the main UK university league tables. These place more emphasis on teaching and student experience than global rankings, using criteria such as teaching quality and learning resources, entry standards, employment prospects, research quality and dropout rates.

In the 2023 Complete University Guide subject tables, UCL was ranked in the top ten in 34 subjects out of 42 offered (81%). It was ranked top for American studies, linguistics, speech and language therapy, and building.

In the 2023 Guardian University Guide subject tables, UCL is ranked top in construction, surveying and planning. It was ranked in the top ten for 21 of 31 subjects offered (68%).

UCL is ranked top in the 2023 Times/Sunday Times Good University Guide for American studies, building, information systems and management, liberal arts, and town and country planning. It is ranked in the top ten for 31 of 44 subjects offered (70%). The 2023 Good University Guide also ranked UCL 98 in their social inclusion ranking (covering England and Wales).

Analysis by the Department for Education in 2018, found that UCL had an impact on earnings of graduates five years after graduation of +15.5% for women (7th highest impact) and +16.2% for men (10th highest impact) compared to average graduates with similar background characteristics (prior attainment, socio-economic status, etc.) and subject choice.

Global

In the 2020 Academic Ranking of World Universities, UCL was ranked 16th in the world. In the 2016 subject tables it was ranked 8th for Clinical Medicine & Pharmacy, joint 51st to 75th for Engineering, Technology and Computer Sciences, 9th for Life & Agricultural Sciences, joint 51st to 75th for Natural Sciences and Mathematics and joint for Social Sciences.

In the 2022 QS World University Rankings, UCL was ranked 8th in the world. In the 2019/20 Rankings by Subject, UCL had 38 subjects in the world top 100. It was ranked in the world top 10 for nine subjects: anthropology (10th), archaeology (3rd), architecture (1st), anatomy and physiology (5th), education and training (1st), geography (7th), medicine (9th), pharmacy and pharmacology (7th), and psychology (10th). In broad subject areas, it ws ranked 10th for life sciences and medicine, 15th for arts and humanities, 34th for social sciences and management, 49th for engineering and technology, and 63rd equal for natural sciences. In the QS Graduate Employability Ranking, UCL was ranked 22nd.

In the 2021 Times Higher Education World University Rankings, UCL was ranked 16th in the world. In the 2016/17 subject tables it was ranked 4th in the world for Arts and Humanities, 6th for Clinical, Pre-Clinical and Health, 12th for Computer Science, joint 38th for Engineering and Technology, 12th for Life Sciences, joint 23rd for Physical Sciences and 14th for Social Sciences. In the 2017 Times Higher Education World Reputation Rankings, UCL was ranked 16th in the world. In the 2015 Times Higher Education Global Employability University Ranking, UCL was ranked 48th in the world.

In 2020, UCL was ranked 8th among the universities around the world by SCImago Institutions Rankings. UCL was ranked 18th in the world for number of publications and 18th for quality of publications in the 2019 CWTS Leiden Ranking. UCL was ranked 3rd in the world in the 2019/20 University Ranking by Academic Performance. UCL was ranked 6th in the world in the 2019 National Taiwan University Performance Ranking of Scientific Papers for World Universities. UCL was also ranked 10th in the world in the 2020 Round University Ranking. In the 2018 U.S. News & World Report Best Global University Ranking, UCL was ranked 22nd in the world.

Admissions

Admission to UCL is highly selective with an average entry tariff for 2020–21 of 189 UCAS points (approximately equivalent to AAAB at A-level), the 9th highest in the country. According to a Freedom of Information request response, UCL's offer rate for 2021 admission was 36.1% at undergraduate level and 23.5% at postgraduate level across all applicants.

International students have made up the majority of main-scheme applicants to UCL since 2015 and the majority of acceptances since 2017. The ratio of main-scheme applicants to acceptances in 2022 was 10.3 for UK applicants and 9.9 for international applicants. Within the UK, UCL is a local recruiter, with 47.4% of 2022 UK admissions coming from the London region and a further 28.1% from the adjacent East of England and South East regions.

Of UCL's young UK domiciled undergraduates, 32.7% were privately educated in 2019–20, the eighth highest proportion amongst mainstream British universities. In the 2016–17 academic year, the university had a domicile breakdown of 59:12:30 of UK:EU:non-EU students respectively with a female to male ratio of 58:42.

Undergraduate law applicants are required to take the National Admissions Test for Law and undergraduate medical applicants are required to take the BioMedical Admissions Test. Applicants for European Social and Political Studies are required to take the Thinking Skills Assessment (TSA) should they be selected for an assessment day. Medicine, pharmacy and English also interview undergraduate applicants prior to making an offer of admission.

Widening access

UCL runs a contextual offer scheme called Access UCL. Eligibility can be through an applicant living in a deprived areas or an area with low participation in higher education, through having spent time in care, though being a young adult carer, or through being estranged from their family. Except for applicants that have spent time in care, the scheme requires applicants to have attended a state school. Mature applicants are assessed on the same criteria, and are additionally not eligible of they have completed or are on the final year of an undergraduate degree. While the scheme enables applicants from disadvantaged backgrounds to receive contextual offers, which are lower than the standard offer for a course, it does not guarantee that an offer will be made. Contextual offers vary by course. For example, a contextual offer for the law LLB reduces the requirement from A*AA to BBB, but for the physics MSci from A*AA to AAB.

UCL also runs week-long UCL Summer Schools for high-achieving students from disadvantaged backgrounds in partnership with the Sutton Trust. These give participants the opportunity to explore London, to develop skills in their chosen subject, to improve their university applications through personal statement workshops and talks by admissions tutors, and to take part in social activities.

From the 2023/24 academic year, UCL will be launching an engineering foundation year based at UCL East for students who don't meet UCL's normal entry requirements, who attended UK state schools for A levels or equivalent (unless refugees), and who live in an area with high levels of at least one axis of deprivation.

For UK domiciled young full-time undergraduate entrants in 2020/21, 67.6% came from state schools, significantly below the location-adjusted benchmark of 74.5%, and 4.3% came from low participation neighbourhoods, not significantly different from the location-adjusted benchmark of 4.0%. For UK-domiciled undergraduate entrants in 2022/23, UCAS data shows no significant difference in offer rate with ethnicity or gender, and a statistically significantly higher offer rate for students from the 20% of neighbourhoods with the lowest rates of participation in higher education.

International foundation programmes
UCL runs intensive one-year foundation courses called the Undergraduate Preparatory Certificate that are aimed at international students who do not have suitable qualifications for direct admission to UCL. There are two pathways – one in science and engineering called the UPCSE; and one in the humanities called UPCH. In 2022, 53% of students progressed to an undergraduate programme at UCL and 38% at another British university.

Student life

Students' union

Founded in 1893, Students' Union UCL, formerly the UCL Union, is one of the oldest students' unions in England, although postdating the Liverpool Guild of Students which formed a student representative council in 1892. Students' Union UCL operates both as the representative voice for UCL students, and as a provider of a wide range of services. It is democratically controlled through General Meetings and referendums, and is run by elected student officers. The union also supports a range of services, including numerous clubs and societies, sports facilities, an advice service, and a number of bars, cafes and shops.

 there are over 250 clubs and societies under the umbrella of the UCL Union. These include: UCL Snowsports (one of the largest sports society at UCL, responsible for organising the annual UCL ski trip), Pi Media (responsible for Pi Magazine and Pi Newspaper, UCL's official student publications), the Debating Society (established 1829), and the UCL Union Film Society, with past members including Christopher Nolan.

Faith
From its foundation the college has been deliberately secular; the initial justification for this was that it would enable students of different Christian traditions (specifically Roman Catholics, Anglicans and Nonconformists) to study alongside each other without conflict. In order to cater to people of all faiths, UCL opened a prayer room (with attached ablution facilities) and a silent meditation room in the student centre in February 2019, and there is a quiet contemplation room behind 16-26 Gordon Square. There is also a Christian chaplain (who also serves as interfaith advisor) and there are student societies for most major religions.

Sport
The union runs over 70 sports clubs, including the UCL Cricket Club (Men's and Women's), UCL Boat Club (Men's and Women's clubs), UCL Running, Athletics and Cross Country Club (RAX), and UCL Rugby Club (Men's and Women's), as well as RUMS sports clubs, open for Medical students.

UCL clubs compete in inter-university fixtures in the British Universities and Colleges Sport (BUCS) competition in a range of sports, including athletics, basketball, cricket, fencing, football, hockey, netball, rugby union and tennis. In the 2021/22 season, UCL finished in 16th position in the final BUCS rankings.

UCL sports facilities include a fitness centre at the main UCL campus in Bloomsbury and a  athletics ground in Shenley, Hertfordshire, part of which is used as the Watford Football Club Training Ground. It also exercises effective control over Somers Town Community Sports Centre, with the power to appoint five of the nine trustees. The sports centre includes a six-court,  sports hall, as well as a  activity/dance studio and an all-weather  outdoor multi-use games area.

Mascot
The UCL mascot was Phineas MacLino, or Phineas, a wooden tobacconist's sign of a kilted Jacobite Highlander stolen from outside a shop in Tottenham Court Road during the celebrations of the relief of Ladysmith, part of the Second Boer War, in March 1900. In 1922, Phineas was stolen by students from King's, marking the start of 'mascotry', leading to an hour-long battle and the eventual return of Phineas. In 1993, the students' union's centenary year, Phineas was placed in the third floor bar of 25 Gordon Street and the bar named after him. In 2019, the students' union voted to remove the mascot from the bar due to its links to imperialism and British colonialism.

Rivalry with King's College London

UCL has a long-running, mostly friendly rivalry with King's College London, which has historically been known as "Rags". UCL students have been referred to by students from King's as the "Godless Scum of Gower Street", in reference to a comment made at the founding of King's, which was based on Christian principles. UCL students in turn referred to King's as "Strand Polytechnic".

Shortly after the 1922 kidnapping of Phineas, King's adopted their own mascot – initially a large papier mâché beer bottle, soon replaced by Reggie the Lion. During the 1927 rag, Reggie was captured by UCL students and his body filled with rotten apples. During the same year, an attempt by King's students to capture Phineas led to the "Battle of Gower Street", caught on camera by British Pathe. On another occasion, Reggie was castrated by UCL students.

King's students stole the embalmed head of Jeremy Bentham in October 1975, only returning it after UCL paid a ransom to charity. The head is now kept in the UCL vaults.

Student campaigns
In 2010, protests by students and staff led UCL to promise to pay a living wage to all UCL staff.

As part of the protests against the UK government's plans to increase student fees, around 200 students occupied the Jeremy Bentham Room and part of the Slade School of Fine Art for over two weeks during November and December 2010. The university successfully obtained a court order to evict the students but stated that it did not intend to enforce the order if possible.

The late 2010s saw student campaigns around the cost of university-run accommodation. In 2016, over 1000 students took part in a rent strike in protest against high rents and poor conditions. Organisers said they had won over £1 million in rent cuts, freezes and grants from UCL in the settlement that ended the strike. Another rent strike in 2017 lead to UCL pledging around £1.4 million in bursaries and rent freezes, mostly in the form of accommodation bursaries for less well-off students totalling £600,000 per year for the 2017/18 and 2018/19 academic years. Another rent strike was held at two halls of residence in the third term of the 2017/18 academic year due to complaints over conditions at those halls.

Student body

In the 2021/22 academic year, UCL had a total of 46,830 students, of whom 23,800 were undergraduates (11,000 UK, 12,800 international), 16,910 were taught postgraduates (8,160 UK, 8,745 international) and 6,120 were research postgraduates (3,520 UK, 2,600 international). In that year, UCL had the second-largest total number of students of any university in the United Kingdom (after the Open University) and the largest number of postgraduate students. However, in terms of UK undergraduates it was 68th by size It had been the UK university with the highest number of international students every year since 2014/15.

In 2021/22, 87% of UCL's students were full-time and 13% part-time, although among undergraduates only 3% were part-time. The student body was split 60.8% female, 39.1% male and 0.1% other gender identity. 24,145 UCL students (52%) were from outside the UK, of whom 15,795 were from Asia, 4,400 from the European Union, 1,440 from North America, 890 from elsewhere in Europe, 790 from the Middle East, 370 from Africa, 310 from South America, and 155 from Australasia; 45% of overseas students at UCL – 10,785 – came from China. Additionally, UCL had 895 students studying wholly overseas in 2021/22 (10 undergraduate, 785 taught postgraduate and 80 research postgraduate) that are not included in the count of the student population.

For UK domiciled students, UCL's student body in 2021/22 was 52.9% white, 26.4% Asian, 7.6% mixed, 6.4% black and 4.6% other, compared to an average across London institutions of 47.8% white, 22.2% Asian, 6.7% mixed, 15.5% black and 4.9% other. Over the whole student body, 12.5% had a known disability, compared to 15.8% across all institutions.

Diversity

UCL holds an institutional silver Athena SWAN award. It gained its first institutional award (bronze) in 2006 and was promoted to silver in 2015.  21 departments across UCL hold bronze awards, 17 hold silver awards and three hold gold awards.

UCL also holds an institutional bronze Race Equality Charter award, which it first gained in 2015.

UCL was formerly a member of Stonewall Diversity Champions scheme, promoting LGBT+ equality. It left in February 2020 as a cost-cutting measure and then controversially decided in late 2021 not to rejoin, against the advice of its equality diversity and inclusion committee, following a vote of the academic board that expressed fears that membership of the scheme could inhibit academic freedom. The decision not to rejoin was strongly opposed by staff and student LGBT+ groups at UCL and by the students' union.

Notable people 

UCL alumni include Francis Crick (co-discoverer of the structure of DNA), William Stanley Jevons (an early pioneer of modern economics) and Charles K. Kao ("Godfather of broadband"). Notable former staff include Peter Higgs (proposer of the Higgs mechanism which predicted the existence of the Higgs boson), Lucian Freud (artist) and Sir William Ramsay (discoverer of all of the naturally occurring noble gases).

Nobel Prizes have been awarded to 30 UCL academics (including visiting academics) and alumni (16 in Physiology or Medicine, seven in Chemistry, five in Physics and one each in Literature and Economic Sciences) as well as three Fields Medals in Mathematics.

Notable alumni
In the 19th century UCL operated as a college, with many students taking individual lecture courses rather than studying for degrees.
These included well-known alumni such as Mahatma Gandhi and John Stuart Mill. In the list below, such alumni are identified by notes.

Notable UCL alumni include:

 Academic administrators including Edith Clara Batho (Principal of Royal Holloway College 1945–1962) and Marc Tessier-Lavigne (current president of Stanford University); 
 Actors, entertainers and filmmakers including Ken Adam (set designer for the James Bond films), Franny Armstrong (director), Ricky Gervais (comedian and actor), James Robertson Justice (actor), Jim Loach (film and television director) and Christopher Nolan (film director);  
 Architects (see also ) including Ethel Charles and Bessie Charles, the first women to be admitted to RIBA, George Clarke (The Restoration Man, George Clarke's Amazing Spaces) and Arthur Ling;
 Artists (see also ) including Dora Carrington (painter), Sir William Coldstream (realist painter), Wyndham Lewis (vorticist painter), Antony Gormley (sculptor), Augustus John (painter, draughtsman and etcher), Gerry Judah (artist and designer), Ben Nicholson (abstract painter), Eduardo Paolozzi (sculptor and artist), and Ibrahim el-Salahi (artist and painter);
 Authors including Raymond Briggs, Robert Browning, Amit Chaudhuri, G. K. Chesterton, David Crystal, Cecil William Davidge, Stella Gibbons, Helen MacInnes, Chioma Okereke, Clive Sansom, Rabindranath Tagore, Demetrius Vikelas (also first President of the International Olympic Committee) and Marianne Winder;
 Business people including Colin Chapman (founder of Lotus Cars), Demis Hassabis (co-founder and CEO of DeepMind), Lord Digby Jones (former Director-General of the Confederation of British Industry), Farhad Moshiri (Everton F.C. part owner), Edwin Waterhouse (founding partner of PwC) and Dame Sharon White (chair of the John Lewis Partnership and former chief executive of Ofcom); 
 Engineers and scientists including Alexander Graham Bell (inventor of the telephone), Arthur Blok (first administrative head of the Technion – Israel Institute of Technology), Nigel Bonner (ecologist and zoologist), Margaret Burbidge (one of the founders of stellar nucleosynthesis and first author of the influential B2FH paper), Edgar Claxton (part of the 1960s team which electrified sections of the British mainline railway network),  Francis Crick (co-discoverer of the structure of DNA), Israel Dostrovsky (Israeli physical chemist and fifth president of the Weizmann Institute of Science), Hans Eysenck (psychologist who created the modern scientific theory of personality), Ambrose Fleming (inventor of the vacuum tube), Patrick Head (co-founder of the Williams Formula One team), Jaroslav Heyrovský (father of the electroanalytical method), David Jewitt (co-discoverer of the Kuiper belt), Charles Kuen Kao (pioneer of the use of fibre optics in telecommunications), Christine E. Morris (archaeologist) and Freda Nkirote (Director of the British Institute in Eastern Africa and President of the Pan-African Archaeological Association);
 Journalists and commentators including Walter Bagehot (former editor of The Economist),  Sarah Cullen (former ITN home affairs correspondent), Jonathan Dimbleby (television and radio current affairs presenter), Roly Drower (satirist and activist), A. A. Gill (columnist) and Simon Inglis (architectural historian and sports writer);
 Lawyers including A. S. Anand (Chief Justice of India), Thomas Chisholm Anstey (Attorney General of Hong Kong), Lord Cozens-Hardy (Master of the Rolls),  Samuel Azu Crabbe (Chief Justice of Ghana), Taslim Olawale Elias (Chief Justice of Nigeria),   Vincent Floissac (Chief Justice of the Eastern Caribbean Supreme Court), Joseph Fok (permanent judge of the Court of Final Appeal of Hong Kong), Dia Forrester (Attorney General of Grenada), Lord Goldsmith (Attorney General of England and Wales), G. Aubrey Goodman (appointed Chief Justice of the Straits Settlements; died before taking office), William Meigh Goodman (Chief Justice of the Supreme Court of Hong Kong), Nicholas John Hannen (Chief Justice of the British Supreme Court for China and Japan), Lord Herschell (Lord Chancellor), Hassan Bubacar Jallow (Attorney General of the Gambia and Chief Justice of the Gambia), George Jessel (Master of the Rolls), Lord Nathaniel Lindley (Master of the Rolls), Dappula de Livera (Attorney General of Sri Lanka),  Baroness Scotland (Attorney General of England and Wales and Secretary General of the Commonwealth), Tan Boon Teik (Attorney General of Singapore), Yang Ti-liang (Chief Justice of the Supreme Court of Hong Kong), Chao Hick Tin (Attorney-General of Singapore), Lord Woolf (Lord Chief Justice of England and Wales and Master of the Rolls) and Arifin Zakaria (Chief Justice of Malaysia);
 Medical researchers and specialists including G. Marius Clore (molecular biophysicist and structural biologist at the National Institutes of Health, pioneer of biological NMR spectroscopy), Archie Cochrane (medic, researcher, and pioneer of evidence-based medicine), Jane Dacre (past president of the Royal College of Physicians), Jeremy Farrar (current Director of the Wellcome Trust), Clare Gerada (previous president of the Royal College of General Practitioners), Joseph Lister (pioneer of antiseptic surgery), Barbara Low (founder member of the British Psychoanalytical Society), and Clare Marx (former president of the Royal College of Surgeons of England);
 Musicians and composers including Brett Anderson (lead singer of the band Suede), all of the members of the band Coldplay (Guy Berryman, Jonny Buckland, Will Champion and Chris Martin), Justine Frischmann (lead singer of the band Elastica), Gustav Holst (composer) and Tim Rice-Oxley (member of the band Keane);
 Political figures and politicians including Nicos Anastasiades (President of Cyprus, 2013–), Elliott Belgrave (Governor-General of Barbados, 2012–2017), Ellis Clarke (Governor-General of Trinidad and Tobago then first President of Trinidad and Tobago, 1972–1987),  Thérèse Coffey (former Deputy Prime Minister of the United Kingdom), Sir Stafford Cripps (former Chancellor of the Exchequer), Terry Davis (Secretary General of the Council of Europe, 2004–2009), Mahatma Gandhi (leader of the Indian independence movement), Chaim Herzog (former President of Israel), Itō Hirobumi (first Prime Minister of Japan), Jomo Kenyatta (first Prime Minister, first president and "Father of the Nation" of Kenya), Benedicto Kiwanuka (Chief Minister of the Uganda Protectorate, 1961–1962, first Prime Minister of Uganda, 1962, Chief Justice of Uganda, 1971–72), Junichiro Koizumi (former prime minister of Japan), Charles Lilley (Premier of Queensland,1868–1870), Kwame Nkrumah (first prime minister, president and "Founder" of Ghana and "Father" of African Nationalism), Sir Seewoosagur Ramgoolam (first Prime Minister and "Father of the Nation" of Mauritius), Harold Bernard St. John (Prime Minister of Barbados, 1985–1986) and Nadhim Zahawi (former Chancellor of the Exchequer);
 Religious figures including Michael Adler (first Jewish chaplain to serve in a theatre of war) and Francis Lyon Cohen (first Jewish chaplain in the British Army); 
 Revolutionaries and political campaigners including Aliza Ayaz (world's youngest United Nations Goodwill Ambassador and leader of the campaign for UCL to divest from fossil fuels) and Madan Lal Dhingra (Indian revolutionary and pro-independence activist), and Marie Stopes (campaigner for eugenics and women's rights); 
 Sports people including David Gower (former captain of the England cricket team), Christine Ohuruogu (Olympic and World 400 metres gold medalist) and Andrew Simpson (sailor and Olympic gold medalist);
 Statisticians including Kirstine Smith (credited with the creation of optimal design of experiments).

Notable academics

Notable former UCL academics include John Austin (legal philosopher), A.J. Ayer (philosopher), William Bayliss and Ernest Starling (discoverers of hormones at UCL), William Henry Bragg (Nobel Prize winner), Jocelyn Bell Burnell (co-discoverer of radio pulsars), A. S. Byatt (writer), Jack Drummond (noted for his work on nutrition as applied to the British diet under rationing during the Second World War), Ronald Dworkin (legal philosopher and scholar of constitutional law), Tom Dyckhoff (writer, broadcaster and historian on architecture), Sir Ambrose Fleming (inventor of the first thermionic valve, the fundamental building block of electronics), Lucian Freud (painter), Hannah Fry (data scientist, mathematician and BBC presenter), Carl Gombrich (opera singer and co-founder of the London Interdisciplinary School), Andrew Goldberg (chairman of Medical Futures), Otto Hahn (Nobel prize winner), Peter Higgs (Nobel prize winner and the proposer of the Higgs mechanism, which predicted the existence of the Higgs boson), A. E. Housman (classical scholar, and poet), Andrew Huxley (physiologist and biophysicist), William Stanley Jevons (economist), David Kemp (the first scientist to demonstrate the existence of the otoacoustic emissions), Frank Kermode (literary critic), Peter T. Kirstein (computer scientist, significant role in the creation of the Internet),  Dadabhai Naoroji (Indian Parsi leader, the second Asian to be elected to UK House of Commons), Karl Pearson (eugenicist and founder of the world's first university statistics department at UCL), George R. Price (population geneticist), Sir William Ramsay (discoverer of the naturally occurring noble gases) and Edward Teller ("Father of the Hydrogen Bomb").

See also
 Armorial of UK universities
 List of universities in the UK

Notes

References

Further reading
 
 Furlong, Gillian (2015). Treasures from UCL. London: UCL Press. .

External links

 
 Pi Media – student newspaper

 
1826 establishments in England
Educational institutions established in 1826
Russell Group
Universities UK
University of London